Tyler Linden Wilson (born 26 May 1989) is an American-born former Puerto Rican international footballer.

Career

Club career
Wilson signed his first professional contract in March 2011 when he signed with the Puerto Rico Islanders of the North American Soccer League. The Islanders announced on December 27, 2011 that Wilson would return for the 2012 season.

International career
Wilson made his international debut for Puerto Rico in 2010.

Personal life
Wilson was born in Chino Hills, California. Wilson's uncle is Michael Boulware, who plays American football.

References

1989 births
Living people
American soccer players
Puerto Rican footballers
Puerto Rico international footballers
UC Riverside Highlanders men's soccer players
Puerto Rico Islanders players
FC Tucson players
Soccer players from California
North American Soccer League players
USL League Two players
Association football midfielders